Aframomum longiscapum is a species of plant in the ginger family, Zingiberaceae. It was first described by Joseph Dalton Hooker and got its current name from Karl Moritz Schumann.

Range
Aframomum longiscapum is native to Western Tropical Africa.

References 

longiscapum